In sociology, the upper middle class is the social group constituted by higher status members of the middle class. This is in contrast to the term lower middle class, which is used for the group at the opposite end of the middle-class stratum, and to the broader term middle class. There is considerable debate as to how the upper middle class might be defined. According to sociologist Max Weber, the upper middle class consists of well-educated professionals with postgraduate degrees and comfortable incomes.

The American upper middle class is defined similarly using income, education, and occupation as the predominant indicators. In the United States, the upper middle class is defined as consisting mostly of white-collar professionals who not only have above-average personal incomes and advanced educational degrees but also a higher degree of autonomy in their work. The main occupational tasks of upper-middle-class individuals tend to center on conceptualizing, consulting, and instruction.

American upper middle class

The American middle class (and its subdivisions) is not a strictly defined concept across disciplines, as economists and sociologists do not agree on defining the term.  In academic models, the term "upper middle class" applies to highly educated, salaried professionals whose work is largely self-directed. Many have postgraduate degrees, with educational attainment serving as the main distinguishing feature of this class. Household incomes commonly exceed $100,000 ($133,000 in 2020 dollars).  Typical professions for this class include lawyers, physicians, military officers, psychologists, certified public accountants, pharmacists, optometrists, financial planners, dentists, engineers, scientists, professors, architects, urban planners, civil service executives, and civilian contractors.

In addition to having autonomy in their work, above-average incomes, and advanced educations, the upper middle class also tends to be influential, setting trends and largely shaping public opinion. Overall, members of this class are also secure from economic down-turns and, unlike their counterparts in the statistical middle class, do not need to fear downsizing, corporate cost-cutting, or outsourcing—an economic benefit largely attributable to their postgraduate degrees and comfortable incomes, likely in the top income quintile or top third.

Income

While many Americans cite income as the prime determinant of class, occupational status, educational attainment, and value systems are equally important variables. Income is in part determined by the scarcity of certain skill sets. An occupation that requires a scarce skill set which is attained through higher educational degree, and which involves higher autonomy, responsibility and influence, will usually offer higher economic compensation. Qualifying for such higher income often requires that individuals obtain the necessary skills (e.g., by attending law, medical, or postgraduate school) and demonstrate the necessary competencies. There are also differences between household and individual income. In 2005, 42% of US households (76% among the top quintile) had two or more income earners; as a result, 18% of households but only 5% of individuals had six-figure incomes. To illustrate, two nurses each making $55,000 per year can out-earn, in a household sense, a single attorney who makes a median of $95,000 annually.

Sociologists Dennis Gilbert, William Thompson and Joseph Hickey estimate the upper middle class to constitute roughly 15% of the population. Using the 15% figure one may conclude that the American upper middle class consists, strictly in an income sense, of professionals with personal incomes in excess of $62,500 ($83,000 in 2020 dollars), who commonly reside in households with six-figure incomes.  The difference between personal and household income can be explained by considering that 76% of households with incomes exceeding $90,000 (the top 20%, $140,000 to cross this threshold in 2020 dollars) had two or more income earners. In 2020, the threshold for entering the top 15% of American household incomes is $166,000 

Note that the above income thresholds may vary greatly based on region due to significant differences in average income based on region and urban, suburban, or rural development. In more expensive suburbs, the threshold for the top 15% of income earners may be much higher. For example, in 2006 the ten highest income counties had median household incomes of $85,000 compared to a national average of about $50,000. The top 15% of all US income earners nationally tend to be more concentrated in these richer suburban counties where the cost of living is also higher. If middle-class households earning between the 50th percentile ($46,000) and the 85th percentile ($62,500) tend to live in lower cost of living areas, then their difference in real income may be smaller than what the differences in nominal income suggest.

Values
Upper-middle-class people tend to highly value tertiary education for themselves and their children, favoring the pursuit of undergraduate and postgraduate degrees.

Political ideology is not found to be correlated with social class; however, a statistical relationship is seen between the level of one's educational attainment and one's likelihood of subscribing to a particular political ideology. In terms of income, liberals tend to be tied with pro-business conservatives. Most mass affluent households tend to be more right-leaning on fiscal issues but more left-leaning on social issues. The majority, between 50% and 60%, of households with incomes above $50,000 overall, not all of whom are upper middle class, supported the Republican Party in the 2000, 2004, and 2006 elections. Those with postgraduate degrees in education statistically favor the Democratic Party. For example, in 2005, 72% of surveyed full-time faculty members at four-year institutions, the majority of whom would be considered upper middle class, identified themselves as liberal.

The upper middle class is often the dominant group to shape society and bring social movements to the forefront. Movements such as the peace movement, the anti-nuclear movement, environmentalism, the anti-smoking movement, and even in the past with blue laws and the temperance movement have been in large part (although not solely), products of the upper middle class. Some claim this is because this is the largest class (and the lowest class) with any true political power for change, while others claim some of the more restrictive social movements (such as with smoking and drinking) are based upon "saving people from themselves."

British upper middle class

The upper middle class in Britain traditionally consists of the educated professionals who were born into higher-income backgrounds, such as legal professionals, executives, and surgeons. This stratum, in England, traditionally uses Received Pronunciation natively. A typical Mosaic geodemographic type for this group would be cultural leadership. It is also usually assumed that this class is most predominant in the home counties of South East England and the more affluent boroughs of London. Children of this group are often educated at a preparatory school until about 13 years old and then at one of the "major" or "minor" British public schools which will typically charge fees of at least £11,500 per year per pupil (as of 2013) followed by studying at post-graduation level.

See also

 Bildungsbürgertum
 Black elite
 Bourgeoisie
 Chungin
 Grand Burgher
 Hipster (contemporary subculture)
 Professional–managerial class
 Upper class
 Yuppie

References

Citations

Bibliography

Further reading

 
Middle class